The Shamattawa First Nation is a remote First Nations community in northern Manitoba, Canada, located in the reserve of Shamattawa 1.

Shamattawa 1 is located on the banks of the Gods River where the Echoing River joins as a right tributary. The population  was 1,019, an increase of 2.1% over the 2011 figure of 998.

As a remote, isolated community, Shamattawa for part of the year is only connected to the rest of the province by winter and ice roads − temporary roads over frozen water. Winter roads also extend east of the community towards Fort Severn, and Peawanuck, Ontario. It can also be reached via Shamattawa Airport. It has only one grocery store.

Climate
Shamattawa has a subarctic climate (Köppen climate classification Dfc) with mild summers and severely cold winters. Precipitation is moderate, but is significantly higher in summer than at other times of the year. Due to its proximity to the Hudson Bay, storm systems often blow ashore with little warning.

References

Keewatin Tribal Council
Indian reserves in Manitoba
First Nations in Northern Region, Manitoba